Thaddeus Victor Jude (born December 13, 1951) is a Republican politician and lawyer from Minnesota. Jude was a candidate in the 2022 Minnesota Attorney General election, but withdrew and endorsed Jim Schultz on May 13, 2022 after being eliminated at the convention. He subsequently ran for Hennepin County Attorney that same year, finishing 4th in the primary. First elected to office in 1972, he has previously served in the Minnesota House of Representatives and in the Minnesota Senate. He also served on the Hennepin County Board of Commissioners and was a Minnesota District Court Judge.

Early life
Jude was born in St. Cloud, Minnesota. He is the oldest of 11 children of Ruth (Huisentruit) Jude and Victor N. Jude. He served in the United States Army Reserves from 1971 to 1977. Jude went to the University of St. Thomas and William Mitchell College of Law. He is a nephew of doctor James Jude, who was one of the developers of cardiopulmonary resuscitation (CPR).

Political and Legal Career 

Jude was the youngest person ever elected to the Minnesota Legislature, elected at the age of 20 when he won election in 1972 and was sworn in at the age of 21 the following January. His father, Victor N. Jude, also served in the Minnesota Legislature. In 1994, Jude ran for Minnesota's 6th congressional district. However, he lost the election to Bill Luther by 0.24%. He ran again in 1996, but lost to Luther by 11.82%. Jude made Minnesota history in emerging from a field of 24 candidates to be elected District Court Judge to Minnesota's 10th Judicial District in 2010. He was reelected without an opponent in 2016. He served as a judge on Minnesota's 10th Judicial District Court.

Legal Experience
Jude is a 1977 graduate of William Mitchell College of Law. His employment includes legal work at the law firms of Jude and Guenningsman; Magsam and Harwig; and Trimble and Associates. He practiced workers' compensation law for the Special Compensation Fund. As a Minnesota Legislature, he was chair of the full House Judiciary Committee and the Senate Civil Justice division. He has served on the Hennepin County Law Library Board and as president of the Richard T. Oakes Inn of Court. His judicial education includes Law and Economics, Antonin Scalia Law School, and George Mason University.

Legislative Interests

Jude chaired the full House Judiciary Committee. His achievements include:

• Laws to protect preborn children from injury or homicide.

• Proposing the constitutional amendment establishing Minnesota's Court of Appeals and the current structure of the Minnesota Supreme Court.

• Combining municipal and county courts into a unified district court trial bench.

• Converting abandoned rail corridors into recreational trials, beginning with the Luce Line Trial.

• Establishing waste to energy, recycling, and composting as alternatives to landfills.

• A statewide 911 emergency reporting and response system.

• Establishing graphic license plates for Minnesota vehicles.

• MTC policing and shelter implementation.

The Minnesota Chamber of Commerce named Jude their citizen legislator of the year in 1987. In 1988, MCCL named Jude their legislator of the year. MADD has given him the outstanding service award. He has been active in many civic organizations, including the American Legion. He has served on the boards of Senior Community Services, Action for Children - Zambia, Minneapolis Institute of Arts, Jodi's Network of Hope, and Catholic Charities.

References

|-

1951 births
Living people
Politicians from St. Cloud, Minnesota
Military personnel from Minnesota
University of St. Thomas (Minnesota) alumni
William Mitchell College of Law alumni
Minnesota lawyers
Minnesota state court judges
Democratic Party Minnesota state senators
Democratic Party members of the Minnesota House of Representatives